The Wentworth-Gardner House is a historic mid-Georgian house, located at 50 Mechanic Street in Portsmouth, New Hampshire, United States. The house is operated as a museum by the Wentworth-Gardner Historic House Association. It is one of the finest extant examples of high-style Georgian architecture in New England, and played a role in the architectural preservation movement of the early 20th century. It was declared a National Historic Landmark in 1968.

Description and history
The Wentworth-Gardner House is a -story wood-frame house that was built in 1760 by Mark Hunking Wentworth, one of New Hampshire's wealthiest merchants and landowners, as a wedding present for his son Thomas. The exterior of its main facade is flushboarded with corner quoining, giving it the appearance of masonry construction. The side walls, and those of the rear ell, are clapboarded. The main facade is five bays wide, with its center entry framed by a Colonial Revival surround added during restoration in 1916-18 by Wallace Nutting. It has a hip roof, with a modillioned cornice. Three dormers pierce each of the front and rear elevations, with the central dormer featuring a segmented-arch pediment, while the flanking ones have triangular pediments.

The interior of the house follows a typical Georgian central-hall plan, with four rooms on each floor, two on either side of the central hall, all having access to one of the two interior chimneys. The hall is particularly broad and elegant, featuring an elliptical arch with keystone, supported by Doric columns. The cornice is particularly elaborate, with modillions and egg-and-dart molding. The stairs rise on the left-hand side, with elaborate turned balusters, and panelled and scrolled step ends. The upper hall continues the rich decorative woodwork found in the lower hall, with Ionic pilasters and a molded architrave.

The southeast front parlor is the finest room in the house, with a fireplace surround highlighted by full-height Corinthian pilasters and a wooden entablature. All of the downstairs rooms have detailed woodwork in the cornice, panelled folding shutters that can be recessed into deep window jambs, and tile surrounding the fireplace.

Wallace Nutting, an antiquarian, purchased the house in 1916, and undertook its restoration. In 1918 he sold it to the Metropolitan Museum of Art, which considered moving it to New York City for display, but this plan was eventually abandoned in favor of in situ preservation. The house was administered by the Society for the Preservation of New England Antiquities (SPNEA, now Historic New England) until it was turned over to the present owner in 1940.

The house was declared a National Historic Landmark in 1968.

Museum
Both this house and the Lear House are now normally open for tours Thursday-Monday between mid-June and mid-October; admission is charged. The Wentworth-Gardner House is available for wedding photography.

See also

Wentworth Lear Historic Houses
List of National Historic Landmarks in New Hampshire
National Register of Historic Places listings in Rockingham County, New Hampshire

References

External links

Wentworth-Gardner Historic House Association
Go Seacoast - Wentworth-Gardner House
Seacoast New Hampshire - Wentworth-Gardner House

National Historic Landmarks in New Hampshire
Houses on the National Register of Historic Places in New Hampshire
Houses completed in 1760
Historic house museums in New Hampshire
Museums in Portsmouth, New Hampshire
Houses in Portsmouth, New Hampshire
National Register of Historic Places in Portsmouth, New Hampshire
Historic district contributing properties in New Hampshire